Emmanuelle Sophie Anne Chriqui (born 10 December 1975) is a Moroccan-Canadian actress. She is known for her performance on HBO's Entourage as Sloan McQuewick, Claire Bonner in Snow Day, Dalia in You Don't Mess with the Zohan, Lorelei Martins on The Mentalist and Lana Lang in the series Superman & Lois.

In May 2010, she topped the AskMen.com Most Desirable Women of 2010 list.

Early life
Chriqui was born in Montreal, Quebec, Canada, the daughter of Moroccan Jewish parents. Her mother, Liliane, was born in Casablanca, and her father, Albert, in Rabat. Her family practiced Orthodox Judaism.

Chriqui has an older brother, Serge, and an older sister, Laurence. When she was almost two, her family moved to Toronto, Ontario. She grew up in Markham, Ontario, a suburb northeast of the city. Her mother, an aesthetician who once told Emmanuelle she would become an actress, died when Chriqui was sixteen years old.

As a child, Chriqui's brother began paying for her to take acting classes. She attended the drama program at Unionville High School, after having studied in high school in Paris and having done two years of comedy studies at the Perimony school (Paris, France),  she decided to pursue a career in acting.

Career
Chriqui began acting as a 10-year-old in a McDonald's commercial. She moved to Vancouver in the mid-1990s, guest-starring in series such as Are You Afraid of the Dark?, Forever Knight, Once a Thief, and Psi Factor: Chronicles of the Paranormal. Her first Hollywood role was as a supporting character in Detroit Rock City (1999). She had a larger role in Chris Koch's teen comedy Snow Day (2000) portraying Claire Bonner, and then appeared in several other Hollywood films, such as 100 Girls, Wrong Turn, On the Line, and In the Mix. She played Eve in the 2005 comedy National Lampoon's Adam & Eve, and played Adam Sandler's love interest Dalia in the 2008 film You Don't Mess with the Zohan.

Chriqui was nominated for a Best Actress DVD Exclusive Award for her performance in 100 Girls and was nominated, with Lance Bass, for a Choice Liplock Teen Choice Award in On the Line. In April 2008, she won the Standout Performance Trophy at the Young Hollywood Awards.

Chriqui also starred in several music videos including Hinder's "Lips of an Angel", Zac Brown Band's "Whatever It Is", and Charles Perry's "I Could Be the Best Time of Your Life". She threw out the ceremonial first pitch at a Los Angeles Dodgers game on June 8, 2008. Chriqui was on the cover of the Autumn 2008 issue of Naked Eye.

She appeared in the 2008 film Cadillac Records as Revetta Chess, where she performed with Beyoncé Knowles. Chriqui was seen in 2009 as one of several women whose lives interconnect in the comedy Women in Trouble and appeared in its 2010 sequel Elektra Luxx.

From the second season to the end of the show's original run, Chriqui played Sloan McQuewick in the hit HBO series Entourage. She reprised the role for the 2015 film of the show. In 2010, Chriqui joined Showtime's series, The Borgias. She is also the voice of Cheetara in the ThunderCats 2011 animated series and lent her voice and physical appearance as Numbers in the hit Activision video game Call of Duty: Black Ops. In 2019, she played Madison in the Netflix film The Knight Before Christmas, opposite Vanessa Hudgens.

In April 2020, Chriqui was cast as Lana Lang on the CW action-superhero series Superman & Lois (part of the Arrowverse) and also portrayed her Bizarro counterpart Lana-Rho in season two.

Personal life
In September 2017, Chriqui became a U.S. citizen. Chriqui practices Transcendental Meditation.

Filmography

Film

Television

Music videos

Video games

References

External links

 

1975 births
20th-century Canadian actresses
21st-century Canadian actresses
20th-century American actresses
20th-century American Jews
21st-century American actresses
21st-century American Jews
Actresses from Montreal
Actresses from Ontario
Canadian child actresses
Canadian expatriate actresses in the United States
Canadian film actresses
American film actresses
Canadian Orthodox Jews
Canadian people of Moroccan-Jewish descent
American people of Canadian descent
American people of Moroccan-Jewish descent
Canadian television actresses
Canadian voice actresses
Jewish Canadian actresses
American television actresses
American voice actresses
Jewish American actresses
Living people
People from Markham, Ontario
People with acquired American citizenship